Nicolás Rajcevich (born 14 September 1978) is a Chilean backstroke swimmer. He competed in two events at the 1996 Summer Olympics.

References

External links
 

1978 births
Living people
Chilean male backstroke swimmers
Olympic swimmers of Chile
Swimmers at the 1996 Summer Olympics
Place of birth missing (living people)
20th-century Chilean people